Princess was a weekly British magazine for girls, published from 30 January 1960 to 16 September 1967 by Fleetway Publications. The publication featured a mix of articles, features, and comic strips. (About one-quarter of each issue was comics.)

True to its name, Princess featured a serial called Famous Royal Daughters by Marjorie Coryn and illustrated by John Millar Watt. Writers whose work was abridged in Princess included Joan Aiken, John Wyndham, Enid Blyton, Sylvia Thorpe, J. R. R. Tolkien, P. L. Travers, T. H. White, and Noel Streatfeild. Other contributors to Princess included David Attenborough, Scott Goodall, Pat Smythe, H. M. Brock, and Tom Kerr.

Covers of Princess always featured a single photograph or illustration, never a comics story.

A second Princess series was published by IPC Magazines in 1983–1984. Early issues featured Diana, Princess of Wales, on the cover.

Publication history

1960-1967 series 
Princess launched 30 January 1960. It was the first original girls' magazine by Fleetway (although the parent company, IPC, had previously acquired School Friend (launched 1950), Girl (launched 1951), and Girls' Crystal (launched 1953).

With the issue of 10 October 1964, the publication absorbed Girl to become New Princess and Girl; by March 1967, the title had reverted to Princess.

There was also a Princess Picture Library, which was published from July 1961 to 1966, when it merged into June and School Friend and Princess Picture Library; and Princess Gift Book for Girls, which was published from 1961 to 1976, long after the comic was no longer being published. There was also a Princess Holiday Special, published in 1965. IPC/Fleetway released a Princess Annual in 1985.

On 23 September 1967, Princess merged with fellow Fleetway title Tina to form the new publication Princess Tina. The Princess strips Alona—The Wild One, Barbie the Model Girl, The Happy Days, and Run, Kristina, Run continued in Princess Tina.

1983–1984 series 
A second Princess series was published by IPC Magazines for 28 issues from 24 September 1983 to 31 March 1984, when it merged into Tammy. It featured Diana, Princess of Wales, on the cover for the first ten issues or so, and also had some photo comics.

Serials

Original serials 
 The Apple Orchard Summer by Jennifer Farley — set in Brittany
 Come Down the Mountain by Vian Smith
 Daughters of Adventure by Marjorie Coryn and John Millar Watt
 Famous Royal Daughters (1960–1967) by Marjorie Coryn, illustrated by John Millar Watt — continued as the center spread of Princess Tina
 The Print of Time by Jennifer Farley — a girl finds a cave painting and pressing her hand onto it, finds herself back in the Stone Age. Oddly truncated just before the merger with Tina and had to come to a sudden end

 Trekkers' Trail by Carol Vaughan 
 Wendy's Wizard illustrated by Richard Rose
 A Year with Grandma illustrated by Gwen Touret

Abridegments 
 Black Hearts in Battersea by Joan Aiken 
 Chocky by John Wyndham, illustrated by Leslie Caswell
 The Famous Five (1960–1963) by Enid Blyton
 The Golden Talisman by Sylvia Thorpe — a cycle of tales about a famous jewel being passed down through generations and affecting the lives of the characters. 
 "The Hawk and His Vengeance," illustrated by Leslie Caswell
 "An Act of Charity," illustrated by F. R. Exell
 The Hobbit by J. R. R. Tolkien
 Mary Poppins by P. L. Travers (Mary Poppins)
 Mistress Masham's Repose by T. H. White
 White Boots by Noel Streatfeild

Strips

1960–1967 
 Alona — The Wild One illustrated by Leslie Otway — continued in Princess Tina
 Barbie the Model Girl, illustrated by E. A. Allen — about the fashion doll of the same name; continued in Princess Tina
 Belle and Mamie, drawn by Harry Lindfield
 Circus Ballerina written by Nobby Clark
 Girl of the Limberlost (1962–1963), by Leslie Otway
 The Happy Days (1960–1967) by Jenny Butterworth and Andrew J. Wilson — continued in Princess Tina
 Heiress to Tangurau (1962) by Leslie Otway
 Life with Uncle Lionel by Scott Goodall and Hugh McNeill
 Lorna Doone (1960) by H. M. Brock
 Nurse Angela by Mike Hubbard
 Pam and Peter drawn by Mollie Higgins
 Run, Kristina, Run written by Terence Magee — continued in Princess Tina
 The Scarlet Pimpernel by John Millar Watt

1983–1984 
 Atchoo!, drawn by Bob Harvey
 Their Darling Daughter..., drawn by Bert Hill
 Farthings' Flight, drawn by Hugo D’Adderio
 The Incredible Shrinking Girl!, drawn by Hugh Thornton-Jones
 Mr Evans the Talking Rabbit — photo comic
 Mini Princess Diana Pinus
 Miranda’s Magic Dragon, drawn by Carlos Freixas
 The Princess Diana Story
 Ring of Feathers, drawn by Santiago Hernandez
 Sadie in Waiting, drawn by Joe Collins
 Stairway to the Stars — photo comic

References

Citations

Sources 
 
 
 
 

1960 comics debuts
1967 comics endings
1983 comics debuts
1984 comics endings
British comics titles
British girls' comics
Children's magazines published in the United Kingdom
Comics anthologies
Comics magazines published in the United Kingdom
Defunct British comics
Defunct magazines published in the United Kingdom
Fleetway and IPC Comics titles
Magazines established in 1960
Magazines disestablished in 1967
Magazines established in 1983
Magazines disestablished in 1984
Weekly magazines published in the United Kingdom
Youth magazines